Daniel Kaha (born February 12, 1989) is an Israeli footballer currently playing for F.C. Be'er Sheva, an Israeli Football team.

Honours
Liga Bet South B (1):
2009-10

References

External links
Stats at Kufsa.co.il
 

1989 births
Living people
Israeli Jews
Israeli footballers
Bnei Eilat F.C. players
Maccabi Be'er Sheva F.C. players
F.C. Be'er Sheva players
Liga Leumit players
Footballers from Eilat
Association football midfielders